"Sandy" is a song written by Steve Brandt and Dion DiMucci, and recorded by Dion in 1962. It was first released on the album Lovers Who Wander. The song spent 11 weeks on the Billboard Hot 100, reaching number 21.

A 1973 Svenne & Lotta recording was released as a single in April 1973, and peaked at number two on Norway's VG-lista chart.

A 1973 Jan Öjlers recording, "Lycka till med nästa kille", charted on Svensktoppen for one week. It peaked at number 10 on October 21, 1973.

Charts

Dion version

Svenne & Lotta version

References

1963 songs
1963 singles
Dion DiMucci songs
1973 singles
Svenne & Lotta songs
Songs written by Dion DiMucci